Sabi Island (Sabi Kyun or Trotter Island) is an island in the Mergui Archipelago of Taninthayi Region, Burma (Myanmar). It lies between Money Island to the south and Parker Island to the north. The narrow channel between Sabi island and Money Island is rather shallow, but the half-mile wide channel between Sabi Island and Parker Island is quite deep.  The island is heavily forested and has small bays with sandy beaches on the west side. The highest point is 326 m above the sea. Whaleback Reef, which lies about three-quarters of mile off the northeast part of the island, is exposed about 8 ft. at low tide.

Notes

Mergui Archipelago
Tanintharyi Region